Madrugada is a Norwegian alternative rock band formed in the town of Stokmarknes in 1993. The key band members included Sivert Høyem (vocals), Robert Burås (guitar) and Frode Jacobsen (bass). After Burås' death on 12 July 2007, Høyem and Jacobsen decided to finish recording what was to be their final album with the original lineup.  On 21 January 2008, the band released Madrugada and announced that they would split after one last tour. They performed their final concert of this tour on 15 November 2008.

In June 2018 it was announced that Høyem, Jacobsen and Lauvland Pettersen had reformed the band for a series of shows in 2019.

According to Anders Kaasen of Allmusic, the band was noted for "its bareboned blues-inspired alt-rock" at the end of the 1990s.

History 
The group of musicians that would go on to become Madrugada formed in the town of Stokmarknes in 1993 under the name 'Abbeys Adoption'.  The band members at this time included Jon Lauvland Pettersen (drums), Frode Jacobsen (bass), Sivert Høyem (vocals), and Marius 'Wah Wah' Johansen (guitar).  In 1995 the band were joined by guitarist Robert Burås and made the decision to move to Oslo where Johansen soon after decided to depart.  By 1998 the band had been signed to a six-album deal by Virgin Music Norway and after a chance meeting with Norwegian author and poet Øystein Wingaard Wolf in an Oslo bar, changed their name to Madrugada.

Their debut album Industrial Silence was released on 30 August 1999 to critical acclaim and was followed by the much darker The Nightly Disease in 2001.  Both albums were toured extensively around Europe and the band built a dedicated cult following in their native Norway, Germany and especially Greece.

After personal relations became fraught, Lauvland Pettersen left the band in early 2002 and was replaced with Simen Vangen.  Soon afterwards, work began on the recording of their third album Grit which saw the band move towards a more raw and experimental sound.  Despite this the album featured perhaps the band's most well known song in the haunting and atmospheric, 'Majesty'.  The band followed the album with yet more extensive touring and a largely unsuccessful attempt to break into the UK music scene.

Madrugada finished recording their fourth album The Deep End  in late 2004.   Recorded at Sound City in Los Angeles with producer George Drakoulias, it was released on 28 February 2005 in Norway, on 31 March in the rest of Europe and finally in the US on 11 April. Lead single "The Kids Are on High Street" was released for domestic radio play on 14 January and a music video was filmed in London.  Simen Vangen announced his departure in early 2005 stating that he wished to focus on various jazz related projects, leaving the band without a permanent drummer.

On 14 December 2005 Madrugada released the live album, Live at Tralfamadore, (named after the fictional home planet of aliens from several novels by the American author Kurt Vonnegut).  By the end of 2005 and less than a month after its release, it became the highest selling album in Norway for that year with The Deep End as the runner-up. The year was capped off with Madrugada winning three awards at the annual Spellemannprisen – the Norwegian equivalent of the Grammys. They won the categories for Best Rock Album, Best Song and Spellemann of the Year.

Following this highly successful period, the band members focused on various side projects.  Sivert Høyem released his second solo album Exiles in 2006 while Robert Burås and his band My Midnight Creeps released their second album, the highly regarded  Histamin in March, 2007.

The band reconvened in the spring of 2007 with Industrial Silence, The Nightly Disease and Histamin producer John Agnello to begin work on their fifth album, but on 12 July 2007 guitarist Robert Burås was found dead in his Oslo apartment.  He was 31 years old.

Following the release of new single "Look Away Lucifer" on 10 December 2007, their final, self-titled album was eventually released on 21 January 2008.  The majority of guitar tracks had been recorded before Robert Burås' death and it was very quickly decided by the remaining members to complete the record in memory of Robert.

In the spring of 2008, joined on guitar by Robert's close friend and My Midnight Creeps bandmate Alex Kloster-Jensen and friend of the band Cato Thomassen, Madrugada embarked on a tour throughout Europe and Norway, playing career spanning set lists along with material from the Madrugada album and on most nights a cover of one of Robert's favourite songs.  In late October 2008 their 11-date farewell tour began, and the last Madrugada concert was held in a sold-out Oslo Spektrum on 15 November 2008.

In 2010 a career spanning double album was released entitled The Best Of Madrugada.  The album included a single new track, the last Madrugada song entitled "All This Wanting To Be Free" whose poignant lyrics dealt with the passing of Robert.

On 15 June 2018, it was announced via the band's Facebook page that they had reunited with original drummer Jon Lauvland Pettersen, announcing a 2019 European tour Eventually growing to over 60 concerts and festival appearances, it soon became their biggest ever tour to date.

Name 
The name madrugada is Portuguese and Spanish and means the period of time between midnight and 6 a.m.. The name was suggested to the band by poet/writer friend Øystein Wingaard Wolf.

Members 

Current members
 Sivert Høyem – vocals (1993–2008, 2018–present)
 Frode Jacobsen – bass (1993–2008, 2018–present)
 Jon Lauvland Pettersen – drums (1993–2002, 2018–present)

Former members
 Robert Burås – guitar (1993–2007, died in 2007)
 Erland Dahlen – drums (2005–2008)
 Simen Vangen – drums (2002–2005)
 Marius Johansen – guitar (1993–1995)

Live members
 Erland Dahlen – percussion (2019)
 Mikael Lindqvist – piano, keyboards 
 Fredrik Viklund – guitar, keyboards (2005–2006)
 Alexander Kloster-Jensen – guitar, keyboards (2008)
 Cato Thomassen –  guitar, keyboards (2008, 2019)
 Christer Knutsen - guitar, keyboards (2019)

Honors 
1999: Spellemannprisen in the category best Rock band, for the album Industrial Silence
2002: Spellemannprisen in the category best Rock band, for the album Grit
2005: Spellemannprisen in the category best Rock band, for the album Live at Tralfamadore
2005: Spellemannprisen in the categories This year's hit song, together with Ane Brun for the tune "Lift me"
2005: Spellemannprisen in the category This year's Spellemann

Discography

Studio albums 
 Industrial Silence (1999) 
 The Nightly Disease (2001) (There is also a limited edition bonus CD: The Nightly Disease Vol. II)
 Grit (2002)
 The Deep End (2005)
 Live at Tralfamadore (2005)
 Madrugada (2008)
 Chimes at Midnight (2022)

EPs 
 Madrugada EP (1998)
 New Depression EP (1999)
 Electric (2000)
 Higher EP (2000)
 Hands Up - I Love You (2001)
 A Deadend Mind (2001)
 Ready (2002)

Singles 
 "Beautyproof" (2000)
 "Majesty" (2003)
 "The Kids Are on High Street" (2005)
 "Lift Me" [featuring Ane Brun] (2005)
 "Look Away Lucifer" (2008)
 "What's On Your Mind?" (2008)
 "Half-Light" (2019)
 "Nobody Loves You Like I Do" (2021)
 "Dreams At Midnight" (2021)
 "The World Could Be Falling Down" (2021)
 "Ecstasy" (2021)

Compilations 
 The Best of Madrugada (2010)

References

External links 
Official website
Madrugada – "What's on Your Mind?" on YouTube

 

Norwegian rock music groups
Norwegian progressive rock groups
Norwegian alternative rock groups
Musical groups established in 1992
Musical groups disestablished in 2008
Musical groups reestablished in 2018
Spellemannprisen winners
Musical groups from Nordland
EMI Records artists
Virgin Records artists